Doxycycline is a broad-spectrum antibiotic of the tetracycline class used in the treatment of infections caused by bacteria and certain parasites. It is used to treat bacterial pneumonia, acne, chlamydia infections, Lyme disease, cholera, typhus, and syphilis. It is also used to prevent malaria in combination with quinine. Doxycycline may be taken by mouth or by injection into a vein.

Common side effects include diarrhea, nausea, vomiting, abdominal pain, and an increased risk of sunburn. Use during pregnancy is not recommended. Like other agents of the tetracycline class, it either slows or kills bacteria by inhibiting protein production. It kills malaria by targeting a plastid organelle, the apicoplast.

Doxycycline was patented in 1957 and came into commercial use in 1967. It is on the World Health Organization's List of Essential Medicines. Doxycycline is available as a generic medicine. In 2020, it was the 79th most commonly prescribed medication in the United States, with more than 9million prescriptions.

Medical use
 
In addition to the general indications for all members of the tetracycline antibiotics group, doxycycline is frequently used to treat Lyme disease, chronic prostatitis, sinusitis, pelvic inflammatory disease, acne, rosacea, and rickettsial infections.

In Canada, in 2004, doxycycline was considered a first-line treatment for chlamydia and non-gonococcal urethritis and with cefixime for uncomplicated gonorrhea.

Antibacterial
Moraxella catarrhalis, Brucella melitensis, Chlamydia pneumoniae, and Mycoplasma pneumoniae are generally susceptible to doxycycline, while some Haemophilus spp., Mycoplasma hominis, and Pseudomonas aeruginosa have developed resistance to varying degrees.

It is used in the treatment and prophylaxis of anthrax and Leptospirosis. It is also effective against Yersinia pestis (the infectious agent of bubonic plague), and is prescribed for the treatment of Lyme disease, ehrlichiosis, and Rocky Mountain spotted fever.

Doxycycline is indicated for treatment of:
 Rocky Mountain spotted fever, typhus fever and the typhus group, Q fever, rickettsialpox, and tick fevers caused by Rickettsia
 Respiratory tract infections caused by Mycoplasma pneumoniae
 Lymphogranuloma venereum, trachoma, inclusion conjunctivitis, and uncomplicated urethral, endocervical, or rectal infections in adults caused by Chlamydia trachomatis
 Psittacosis
 Nongonococcal urethritis caused by Ureaplasma urealyticum
 Relapsing fever due to Borrelia recurrentis
 Chancroid caused by Haemophilus ducreyi
 Plague due to Yersinia pestis
 Tularemia
 Cholera
 Campylobacter fetus infections
 Brucellosis caused by Brucella species (in conjunction with streptomycin)
 Bartonellosis
 Granuloma inguinale (Klebsiella species)
 Lyme disease

When bacteriologic testing indicates appropriate susceptibility to the drug, doxycycline may be used to treat these infections caused by Gram-negative bacteria:
 Escherichia coli infections
 Enterobacter aerogenes (formerly Aerobacter aerogenes) infections
 Shigella species infections
 Acinetobacter species (formerly Mima species and Herellea species) infections
 Respiratory tract infections caused by Haemophilus influenzae
 Respiratory tract and urinary tract infections caused by Klebsiella species

Some Gram-positive bacteria have developed resistance to doxycycline. Up to 44% of Streptococcus pyogenes and up to 74% of S. faecalis specimens have developed resistance to the tetracycline group of antibiotics. Up to 57% of P. acnes strains developed resistance to doxycycline. When bacteriologic testing indicates appropriate susceptibility to the drug, doxycycline may be used to treat these infections caused by Gram-positive bacteria:
 Upper respiratory infections caused by Streptococcus pneumoniae (formerly Diplococcus pneumoniae)
 Skin and soft tissue infections caused by Staphylococcus aureus, including methicillin-resistant Staphylococcus aureus infections
 Anthrax caused by Bacillus anthracis infection

When penicillin is contraindicated, doxycycline can be used to treat:
 Syphilis caused by Treponema pallidum
 Yaws caused by Treponema pertenue
 Listeriosis due to Listeria monocytogenes
 Vincent's infection caused by Fusobacterium fusiforme
 Actinomycosis caused by Actinomyces israelii
 Infections caused by Clostridium species

Doxycycline may also be used as adjunctive therapy for severe acne.

The first-line treatment for brucellosis is a combination of doxycycline and streptomycin and the second-line is a combination of doxycycline and rifampicin (rifampin).

Antimalarial
Doxycycline is active against the erythrocytic stages of Plasmodium falciparum but not against the gametocytes of P. falciparum. It is used to prevent malaria. It is not recommended alone for initial treatment of malaria, even when the parasite is doxycycline-sensitive, because the antimalarial effect of doxycycline is delayed.

The World Health Organization (WHO) guidelines state that the combination of doxycycline with either artesunate or quinine may be used for the treatment of uncomplicated malaria due to P. falciparum or following intravenous treatment of severe malaria.

Antihelminthic
Doxycycline kills the symbiotic Wolbachia bacteria in the reproductive tracts of parasitic filarial nematodes, making the nematodes sterile, and thus reducing transmission of diseases such as onchocerciasis and elephantiasis. Field trials in 2005 showed an eight-week course of doxycycline almost eliminates the release of microfilariae.

Spectrum of susceptibility
Doxycycline has been used successfully to treat sexually transmitted, respiratory, and ophthalmic infections. Representative pathogenic genera include Chlamydia, Streptococcus, Ureaplasma, Mycoplasma, and others. The following represents MIC susceptibility data for a few medically significant microorganisms.
 Chlamydia psittaci: 0.03 μg/mL
 Mycoplasma pneumoniae: 0.016–2 μg/mL
 Streptococcus pneumoniae: 0.06–32 μg/mL

Sclerotherapy 
Doxycycline is also used for sclerotherapy in slow-flow vascular malformations, namely venous and lymphatic malformations, as well as post-operative lymphoceles.

Others
Subantimicrobial-dose doxycycline (SDD) is widely used as an adjunctive treatment to scaling and root planing for periodontitis. Significant differences were observed for all investigated clinical parameters of periodontitis in favor of the scaling and root planing + SDD group where SDD dosage regimens is 20 mg twice daily for three months in a meta-analysis published in 2011.

Contraindications

Pregnancy and lactation
Doxycycline is categorized by the FDA as a class D drug in pregnancy. Doxycycline crosses into breastmilk. Other tetracycline antibiotics are contraindicated in pregnancy and up to eight years of age, due to the potential for disrupting bone and tooth development. They include a class warning about staining of teeth and decreased development of dental enamel in children exposed to tetracyclines in utero, during breastfeeding or during young childhood. However, the FDA has acknowledged that the actual risk of dental staining of primary teeth is undetermined for doxycycline specifically. The best available evidence indicates that doxycycline has little or no effect on hypoplasia of dental enamel or on staining of teeth and the CDC recommends the use of doxycycline for treatment of Q fever and also for tick-borne rickettsial diseases in young children and others advocate for its use in malaria.

Other
Other contraindications are severe liver disease and concomitant use of isotretinoin or other retinoids, as both tetracyclines and retinoids can cause intracranial hypertension (increased pressure around the brain) in rare cases.

Adverse effects
Adverse effects are similar to those of other members of the tetracycline antibiotic group. Doxycycline can cause gastrointestinal upset. Oral doxycycline can cause pill esophagitis, particularly when it is swallowed without adequate fluid, or by persons with difficulty swallowing or impaired mobility. Doxycycline is less likely than other antibiotic drugs to cause Clostridium difficile colitis.

An erythematous rash in sun-exposed parts of the body has been reported to occur in 7.3–21.2% of persons taking doxycycline for malaria prophylaxis. One study examined the tolerability of various malaria prophylactic regimens and found doxycycline did not cause a significantly higher percentage of all skin events (photosensitivity not specified) when compared with other antimalarials. The rash resolves upon discontinuation of the drug.

Unlike some other members of the tetracycline group, it may be used in those with renal impairment.

Doxycycline use has been associated with increased risk of inflammatory bowel disease. In one large retrospective study, patients who were prescribed doxycycline for their acne had a 2.25-fold greater risk of developing Crohn's disease.

Interactions 
The combination of doxycycline with dairy, antacids, calcium supplements, iron products, laxatives containing magnesium, or bile acid sequestrants is not inherently dangerous, but any of these foods and supplements may decrease doxycycline's effectiveness.

Previously, doxycycline was believed to impair the effectiveness of many types of hormonal contraception due to CYP450 induction. Research has shown no significant loss of effectiveness in oral contraceptives while using most tetracycline antibiotics (including doxycycline), although many physicians still recommend the use of barrier contraception for people taking the drug to prevent unwanted pregnancy.

Pharmacology

Doxycycline, like other tetracycline antibiotics, is bacteriostatic. It works by preventing bacteria from reproducing through the inhibition of protein synthesis.

Doxycycline is highly lipophilic, so it can easily enter cells, meaning the drug is easily absorbed after oral administration and has a large volume of distribution. It can also be re-absorbed in the renal tubules and gastrointestinal tract due to its high lipophillicity, giving it a long elimination half life, and it is also prevented from accumulating in the kidneys of patients with kidney failure due to the compensatory excretion in faeces. Doxycycline–metal ion complexes are unstable at acid pH, therefore more doxycycline enters the duodenum for absorption than the earlier tetracycline compounds. In addition, food has less effect on absorption than on absorption of earlier drugs with doxycycline serum concentrations being reduced by about 20% by test meals compared with 50% for tetracycline.

Mechanism of action
Doxycycline is a broad-spectrum bacteriostatic antibiotic. It inhibits the synthesis of bacterial proteins by binding to the 30S ribosomal subunit, which is only found in bacteria. This prevents the binding of transfer RNA to messenger RNA at the ribosomal subunit meaning amino acids cannot be added to polypeptide chains and new proteins cannot be made. This stops bacterial growth giving the immune system time to kill and remove the bacteria.

Pharmacokinetics
The substance is almost completely absorbed from the upper part of the small intestine. It reaches highest concentrations in the blood plasma after one to two hours and has a high plasma protein binding rate of about 80–90%. Doxycycline penetrates into almost all tissues and body fluids. Very high concentrations are found in the gallbladder, liver, kidneys, lung, breast milk, bone and genitals; low ones in saliva, aqueous humour, cerebrospinal fluid (CSF), and especially in inflamed meninges. By comparison, the tetracycline antibiotic minocycline penetrates significantly better into the CSF and meninges.

Doxycycline metabolism is negligible. It is actively excreted into the gut (in part via the gallbladder, in part directly from blood vessels), where some of it is inactivated by forming chelates. About 40% are eliminated via the kidneys, much less in people with end-stage kidney disease. The biological half-life is 18 to 22 hours (16±6 hours according to another source) in healthy people, slightly longer in those with end-stage kidney disease, and significantly longer in those with liver disease.

Chemistry
Expired tetracyclines or tetracyclines allowed to stand at a pH less than 2 are reported to be nephrotoxic due to the formation of a degradation product, anhydro-4-epitetracycline causing Fanconi syndrome. In the case of doxycycline, the absence of a hydroxyl group in C-6 prevents the formation of the nephrotoxic compound. Nevertheless, tetracyclines and doxycycline itself have to be taken with caution in patients with kidney injury, as they can worsen azotemia due to catabolic effects.

Chemical properties
Doxycycline, doxycycline monohydrate and doxycycline hyclate are yellow, crystalline powders with a bitter taste. The latter smells faintly of ethanol, a 1% aqueous solution has a pH of 2–3, and the specific rotation is  −110° cm3/dm·g in 0.01 N methanolic hydrochloric acid.

History
After penicillin revolutionized the treatment of bacterial infections in WWII, many chemical companies moved into the field of discovering antibiotics by bioprospecting. American Cyanamid was one of these, and in the late 1940s chemists there discovered chlortetracycline, the first member of the tetracycline class of antibiotics. Shortly thereafter, scientists at Pfizer discovered terramycin and it was brought to market. Both compounds, like penicillin, were natural products and it was commonly believed that nature had perfected them, and further chemical changes could only degrade their effectiveness. Scientists at Pfizer led by Lloyd Conover modified these compounds, which led to the invention of tetracycline itself, the first semi-synthetic antibiotic. Charlie Stephens' group at Pfizer worked on further analogs and created one with greatly improved stability and pharmacological efficacy: doxycycline. It was clinically developed in the early 1960s and approved by the FDA in 1967.

As its patent grew near to expiring in the early 1970s, the patent became the subject of lawsuit between Pfizer and International Rectifier that was not resolved until 1983; at the time it was the largest litigated patent case in US history. Instead of a cash payment for infringement, Pfizer took the veterinary and feed-additive businesses of International Rectifier's subsidiary, Rachelle Laboratories.

In January 2013, the FDA reported shortages of some, but not all, forms of doxycycline "caused by increased demand and manufacturing issues". Companies involved included an unnamed major generics manufacturer that ceased production in February 2013, Teva (which ceased production in May 2013), Mylan, Actavis, and Hikma Pharmaceuticals. The shortage came at a particularly bad time, since there were also shortages of an alternative antibiotic, tetracycline, at the same time. The market price for doxycycline dramatically increased in the United States in 2013 and early 2014 (from $20 to over $1800 for a bottle of 500 tablets), before decreasing again.

Society and culture
Doxycycline is available worldwide under many brand names. Doxycycline is available as a generic medicine.

Research
Research areas have included:
 Macular degeneration
 Rheumatoid arthritis instead of minocycline (both of which have demonstrated modest efficacy for this disease)

Research reagent
Doxycycline and other members of the tetracycline class of antibiotics are often used as research reagents in in vitro and in vivo biomedical research experiments involving bacteria as well in experiments in eukaryotic cells and organisms with inducible protein expression systems using tetracycline-controlled transcriptional activation. The mechanism of action for the antibacterial effect of tetracyclines relies on disrupting protein translation in bacteria, thereby damaging the ability of microbes to grow and repair; however protein translation is also disrupted in eukaryotic mitochondria impairing metabolism and leading to effects that can confound experimental results. Doxycycline is also used in "tet-on" (gene expression activated by doxycycline) and "tet-off" (gene expression inactivated by doxycycline) tetracycline-controlled transcriptional activation to regulate transgene expression in organisms and cell cultures. Doxycycline is more stable than tetracycline for this purpose. At subantimicrobial doses, doxycycline is an inhibitor of matrix metalloproteases, and has been used in various experimental systems for this purpose, such as for recalcitrant recurrent corneal erosions.

COVID-19 
After a large-scale trial showed no benefit of using doxycycline in treating COVID19, the UK's National Institute for Health and Care Excellence (NICE) updated its guidance to not recommend the medication for the treatment of COVID19.

References

External links 
 

Anti-acne preparations
Antimalarial agents
Dimethylamino compounds
AbbVie brands
Tetracycline antibiotics
World Health Organization essential medicines
Wikipedia medicine articles ready to translate